Edmund Hastings may refer to:

Edmund Hastings, 1st Baron Hastings
Edmund Hastings (MP) for Yorkshire and Northumberland